Sir Matthew White Ridley, 4th Baronet (9 September 1807 – 25 September 1877) was a Conservative Party politician in the United Kingdom.

He was appointed High Sheriff of Northumberland for 1841 and then served as member of parliament (MP) for Northumberland North from 1859 to 1868.

He inherited the baronetcy on the death in 1836 of his father Matthew, and was in turn succeeded by his son Matthew, who was later ennobled as Viscount Ridley.

References

External links 
 

1807 births
1877 deaths
Conservative Party (UK) MPs for English constituencies
Ridley, Matthew, 4th Baronet
UK MPs 1859–1865
UK MPs 1865–1868
High Sheriffs of Northumberland
Matthew